Class AM1 was allocated to the prototype AC electric multiple units, converted from fourth-rail DC electric stock in 1952 and used on the Lancaster/Morecambe/Heysham route. This route had been electrified by the Midland Railway at 6.6 kV, 25 Hz AC. These were withdrawn in 1952 and the service reverted to steam haulage. The line voltage was changed to 6.6 kV at 50 Hz in 1953 and the AM1s were introduced. Thus was a test to see if power could be drawn from the National Grid rather than railway owned power stations. The AM1s were fitted with mercury arc rectifiers but one was later converted to a solid state rectifier as a test.  The stock was maintained at Meols Cop works near Southport.

The line was closed to passengers and the stock withdrawn in early 1966. Unlike classes AM2-AM11, which became TOPS Classes 302–311, class AM1 was withdrawn before it could take its place in the system as class 301. However, it was the success of these tests that contributed to the decision to choose 25 kV AC overhead electrification as standard in Great Britain outside the Southern Region.

History
The electric service started on 17 August 1953, and the trains, very much seen as experimental, ran until 2 January 1966, when they were withdrawn. Each of the four electric trains contained different unique features to test them, and although the original MR electrification equipment, which was still in situ, was used in places, other sections were used for trials of the proposed BR standard electrification features. There was little demand for the service outside the summer holiday season, and the presence of the duplicate former-LNWR route between the Lancaster and Morecambe allowed a replacing diesel service to use that route. The service was complex to operate, for, from the main line ex-LNWR Lancaster Castle station, it ran downhill a short distance to the ex-MR Lancaster Green Ayre station, where trains reversed to run westward along the River Lune to Morecambe Promenade station, where trains reversed again to run to Heysham.

Previous use
The carriages converted to form the prototype units were drawn from former LNWR electric units built in 1914 by the Metropolitan Carriage, Wagon & Finance Company for use on the West London line fourth-rail DC electrification. They had been stored early in World War II after the West London route on which they worked was closed to passengers due to bomb damage. The interiors were modernised with bus-type seating. Driving motor coach 28221 was fitted with a germanium rectifier and displayed at the International Railway Congress, Willesden, London between 26 and 29 May 1954.

Formations
Unit numbers were not allocated, but sets were referred to by the last two digits of the DMBSO number. The numbers of individual carriages were:

See also
 MR electric units
 Morecambe branch line

References

Books
 100 Years of Electric Traction by Colin J Marsden, published by Oxford Publishing Company in 1985, 

AM1
6600 V AC electric multiple units
Train-related introductions in 1952